Alphabet City is the fourth studio album by English pop band ABC. It was originally released in October 1987, on the labels Mercury, Phonogram and Neutron, two years after their previous album How to Be a ... Zillionaire! Following a hiatus in which singer Martin Fry was being treated for Hodgkin's disease, it was recorded over a period of nine months between November 1986 and August 1987, in sessions that took place at Marcus Recording Studios in London, assisted by Bernard Edwards, best known for his work with the American band Chic.

The album's title and the titles of several tracks were inspired by the Alphabet City section of Manhattan, New York City, where Fry and Mark White lived for a time prior to the album's release. It peaked at No. 7 in the UK, making it their first album to reach the Top 10 since their debut The Lexicon of Love. The album launched three charting singles in the UK. "When Smokey Sings", a tribute to Smokey Robinson, peaked at No. 11 on the UK Singles Chart; "The Night You Murdered Love" peaked at No. 31; "King Without a Crown" at No. 44.

In 2005, a digitally remastered CD of the album was released with six bonus tracks.

Background
In a 1987 interview with Record Mirror, Fry said of the album, "It's a record where we sort of caught up with ourselves. For a while we were making records that just seemed to confuse people. It was necessary for us to work from a firm foundation and in a way, we figured Alphabet City might be the last record we ever made anyway, for a lot of reasons. So we figured, let's just make it a statement of our work that drew on all the other records we've made."

Track listing

Personnel 
ABC
 Martin Fry – lead and backing vocals
 Mark White – keyboards, programming, guitars 

Additional personnel
 David Clayton – keyboards
 Brad Lang – bass guitar
 Danny Thompson – double bass
 Graham Broad – drums
 Pandit Dinesh – percussion, tabla
 Luís Jardim (misspelled as "Louis Jardin" on album notes) – percussion
 Howie Casey – saxophones
 Judd Lander – harmonica
 Richard Niles – string arrangements on "When Smokey Sings" and "The Night You Murdered Love"
 Anne Dudley – string arrangements on "One Day" and "Bad Blood"
 Alan Carvell – backing vocals
 Dolette McDonald – backing vocals
 Tessa Niles – backing vocals
 Miriam Stockley – backing vocals
 Linda Taylor – backing vocals

Production 
 Martin Fry – producer
 Mark White – producer
 Bernard Edwards – producer
 Martyn Webber – engineer
 Tim Burrell – assistant engineer
 Julian Mendelsohn – mixing
 Ian Cooper – mastering at the Townhouse Studios (London, UK)
 Andy Earl – photography
 Keith Breeden – artwork
 Peter Curzon – artwork

Charts

Certifications

References

External links

1987 albums
ABC (band) albums
Albums produced by Bernard Edwards
Mercury Records albums